Michael Stanislaw (born 5 June 1987) is an Austrian footballer who plays as a midfielder for Egri FC.

References

External links
 Guardian Football

1987 births
Living people
People from Leoben
Austrian footballers
Austria youth international footballers
Austria under-21 international footballers
Association football midfielders
SC Austria Lustenau players
SC Schwanenstadt players
SC Wiener Neustadt players
Egri FC players
Nemzeti Bajnokság I players
Austrian expatriate footballers
Expatriate footballers in Hungary
Austrian expatriate sportspeople in Hungary
Footballers from Styria